"Scrapple from the Apple" is a bebop composition by Charlie Parker written in 1947, commonly recognized today as a jazz standard, written in F major. The song borrows its chord progression from "Honeysuckle Rose", a common practice for Parker, as he based many of his successful tunes over already well-known chord changes.

While the A section is based on "Honeysuckle Rose", the B section or "middle eight" comes from the rhythm changes, which are based on George Gershwin's "I Got Rhythm".

Other versions
 Lenny Breau – Pickin' Cotten (1977, released 2001)
 Sonny Criss with Tal Farlow – Up, Up, and Away (1967)
 Miles Davis – Many Miles of Davis (1962)
 Curtis Fuller – Jazz Conference Abroad (1962)
 Dexter Gordon – Our Man in Paris (1963)
 Jim Hall – Jim Hall Live! (1975)
 Tom Harrell with Kenny Garrett and Kenny Barron – Moon Alley (1985)
 Keith Jarrett – After the Fall (1998, released 2018)
 Frank Morgan Quartet – Yardbird Suite (1988)
 Gerry Mulligan and Stan Getz – Gerry Mulligan Meets Stan Getz (1957)
 Charlie Parker – Charlie Parker on Dial (1947, released 1993)
 Oscar Pettiford/Red Mitchell – Jazz Mainstream (1957)
 Red Rodney – Scrapple from the Apple (1975)
 Helge Schneider – Es rappelt im Karton (1995)
 Larry Schneider – Mohawk (1994)
 Sonny Stitt – Stitt Plays Bird (1963)
 Sonny Stitt with Oscar Peterson – Sonny Stitt Sits in with the Oscar Peterson Trio (1959)
 The Charlie Watts Orchestra – Live at Fulham Town Hall (1986)
 Phil Woods with Red Garland – Sugan (1957)

See also 
 Contrafact
 List of 1940s jazz standards

References 

1947 compositions
Compositions by Charlie Parker
Jazz compositions
1940s jazz standards
Bebop jazz standards
Jazz compositions in G minor